"Hurt Locker " is a song by American rapper Xzibit. One part in the song also contains a short sample of Beastie Boys' 1992 hit single "So What'cha Want".

Music video
A music video was released on June 17. The single was released on iTunes on June 22. The main sample of the song is taken from the intro to "Bird of Prey" by the rock band Uriah Heep from their 1971 album Salisbury.

2010 singles
Xzibit songs
Song recordings produced by Scoop DeVille
2009 songs
Songs written by Xzibit